Christmas is a 1989 Michael W. Smith studio album and Smith's first Christmas album.

Track listing

Personnel 
 Michael W. Smith – vocals, acoustic piano, keyboards, percussion, track arrangements
 Dann Huff (uncredited) – guitar (2, 8, 9)
 Paul Leim – drums (9)
 Bryan Lenox – percussion
 Ronn Huff – orchestral arrangements and conductor, choral arrangements, track arrangements (1)
 Carl Gorodetzky – concertmaster, contractor
 The Nashville String Machine – orchestra
 The Nashville Festival Orchestra – orchestra
 Mary Bates – backing vocals
 Beverly Darnall – backing vocals
 Ellen Musick – backing vocals
 Leah Taylor – backing vocals
 Cathedral Choir – adult choir
 Fred Bock – music director for Cathedral Choir
 The American Boychoir – boychoir
 James Litton – choir conductor for The American Boychoir
 Amy Grant – vocal soloist (6)
 Nathan Wadley – vocal soloist (7)

Production 
 Michael W. Smith – producer 
 Ronn Huff – producer 
 Michael Blanton – executive producer
 Terry Hemmings – executive producer
 Mark Laycock – orchestra and choir producer
 Bill Whittington – engineer, mixing
 Brent King – orchestra engineer, additional engineering
 Dan Garcia – additional engineering
 Scott MacMinn – additional engineering
 Steve Charles – assistant engineer
 Joe Kraus –  assistant engineer
 Bryan Lenox – assistant engineer
 Rick Horton – editing
 Ron Lewter – mastering
 Elizabeth Jones – production assistant
 D.L. Rhodes – cover coordinator
 Buddy Jackson – art direction, design, cover illustration
 Mark Tucker – photography
 Mary Beth Felts – stylist

Studios
 Recorded at War Memorial Auditorium and Digital Recorders (Nashville, Tennessee); Deer Valley Studio (Franklin, Tennessee); Martin Sound (Alhambra, California); Sigma Sound Studio (Philadelphia, Pennsylvania).
 Mixed at Deer Valley Studio (Franklin, Tennessee).
 Edited at Digital Associates (Nashville, Tennessee).
 Mastered at The Mastering Lab (Los Angeles, California).

"All is Well" 
"All is Well" features soloist Nathan Wadley. The song is also included in his compilation set The Wonder Years (1993). In 2014, Smith remade the song for his 2014 holiday album The Spirit of Christmas, this time sharing the vocals with country artist Carrie Underwood. Christian girl group Point of Grace recorded a version for their 2005 album Winter Wonderland. Clay Aiken recorded a cover version in 2006 for his Christmas EP All Is Well.

Chart performance

References 

1989 Christmas albums
Christmas albums by American artists
Michael W. Smith albums
Reunion Records albums